Terna Engineering College is a private college of engineering in Nerul, Navi Mumbai, Maharashtra, India, affiliated to the University of Mumbai. It was established in 1991 and received approval from the All India Council for Technical Education in 1994. It offers bachelor's and master's degrees in various engineering subjects.

References

Engineering colleges in Mumbai
Affiliates of the University of Mumbai
Education in Navi Mumbai
Educational institutions established in 1991
1991 establishments in Maharashtra